KVXR (1280 AM) is a radio station located in Moorhead, MN airing Catholic programming the Real Presence Radio, including programming from the national EWTN Radio network. KVXR is owned by Real Presence Radio of Grand Forks, North Dakota

History
The station was previously KVOX, a part of James Ingstad's Radio Fargo-Moorhead, though it was donated to Voice of Reason Radio on June 11, 2007. Ingstad purchased KKAG, and KVOX and its format was moved to 740 AM. On September 14, 2007, 1280 changed its call letters to KVXR, and flipped to Relevant Radio, with KVOX moving to 740 AM. On April 23, 2009 Real Presence Radio signed the final papers for purchasing 1280am KVXR from VRR. It now carries the Real Presence Radio network based at KWTL in Grand Forks

External links
Real Presence Radio
ewtn.com

Christian radio stations in Minnesota
Catholic radio stations
Radio stations established in 1984